Logan Thunder may refer to:

 Logan Thunder (WNBL), Women's National Basketball League team
 Logan Thunder (QBL), Queensland Basketball League club